The Boise Depot is a former train station in the western United States, located in Boise, Idaho. Opened  in 1925, it is listed on the National Register of Historic Places (NRHP).

History
The depot was built in 1925 by the Union Pacific Railroad, and service by its Portland Rose began with service between Chicago, Illinois, and Portland, Oregon. Thousands attended its debut with mainline service in mid-April, including Union Pacific president Carl Gray, granted a key to the city by Mayor Eugene Sherman.

The UP's City of Portland also Chicago to Portland, for several decades made stops in Boise. Union Pacific discontinued the Portland Rose and the City of Portland (along with all its passenger rail service) on May 1, 1971, the day Amtrak began operating.

Six years later, Amtrak (the National Railroad Passenger Corporation) resumed passenger service to the station in 1977 with the Pioneer, Initially run between Salt Lake City, Utah, and Seattle, Washington, it was later extended further east and provided daily service from Chicago to Seattle. The next eastbound stop on the Pioneer was originally in Mountain Home, but that station was dropped in 1981, so the next eastbound stop was Shoshone; the next westbound stop was Nampa.

Forty-nine years after its debut, the Boise Depot was listed on the NRHP on August 7, 1974, as the Union Pacific Mainline Depot. The last passenger train to use the depot was the Pioneer, which ended service  in 1997.

In 1990, Boise-based Morrison–Knudsen Corporation (MK) purchased the depot and renovated it to pristine condition. The City of Boise took it over in 1996 and opened it for tours and special events; it is open to the public Sundays and Mondays from 11:00 am to 5:00 pm.

See also

 National Register of Historic Places listings in Ada County, Idaho

References

External links

 Info on Historic Locomotive on site
 City of Boise's Depot webpage

Buildings and structures in Boise, Idaho
Railway stations on the National Register of Historic Places in Idaho
Railway stations in the United States opened in 1925
Railway stations closed in 1997
Former Amtrak stations in Idaho
Former Union Pacific Railroad stations
Tourist attractions in Boise, Idaho
Clock towers in Idaho
National Register of Historic Places in Boise, Idaho
Carrère and Hastings buildings
Repurposed railway stations in the United States